Benjaminiomyces is a genus of fungi in the family Laboulbeniaceae. The genus contains four species.

References

External links
Benjaminiomyces at Index Fungorum

Laboulbeniomycetes